The Men's under-23 road race of the 2010 UCI Road World Championships cycling event took place on 1 October in Melbourne, Australia.

Home rider Michael Matthews claimed Australia's first gold medal of the championships by winning the sprint finish at the end of the race, outsprinting Germany's John Degenkolb, who took silver. Time trial champion Taylor Phinney and Guillaume Boivin of Canada shared the bronze medal after Tissot's photo finish system could not split the riders. Phinney became the sixth rider to medal in both the time trial and the road race in the under-23s category.

Route
The race covered 159 km.

Final classification

References

External links

Men's under-23 road race
UCI Road World Championships – Men's under-23 road race